William Franke is an American academic and philosopher,  professor of Comparative Literature at Vanderbilt University (formerly and concomitantly Professor Catedrático and Head of Philosophy and Religions at the University of Macau, 2013-2016). A main exposition of his philosophical thinking  is A Philosophy of the Unsayable (2014), a book which dwells on the limits of language in order to open thought to the inconceivable. On this basis, the discourses of myth, mysticism, metaphysics, and the arts take on new and previously unsuspected types of meaning. This book is the object of a Syndicate Forum and of a collective volume of essays by diverse hands in the series “Palgrave Frontiers in Philosophy of Religion”: Contemporary Debates in Negative Theology and Philosophy. Franke's apophatic philosophy is based on his two-volume On What Cannot Be Said: Apophatic Discourses in Philosophy, Religion, Literature, and the Arts (2007), which reconstructs in the margins of philosophy a counter-tradition to the thought and culture of the Logos. Franke extends this philosophy in an intercultural direction, entering the field of comparative philosophy, with Apophatic Paths from Europe to China: Regions Without Borders. In On the Universality of What is Not: The Apophatic Turn in Critical Thinking, Franke argues for application of apophatic thinking in a variety of fields and across disciplines, from humanities to cognitive science, as key to reaching peaceful mutual understanding in a multicultural world riven by racial and gender conflict, religious antagonisms, and national and regional rivalries.

Biography 
Franke holds degrees in philosophy and theology from Williams College and Oxford University and in comparative literature from UC Berkeley and Stanford (Ph.D. 1991). He lectures and teaches in English, German, French, and Italian. He is a research fellow of the Alexander von Humboldt-Stiftung and a senior fellow of the International Institute for Hermeneutics (IIH). He has been Fulbright-University of Salzburg Distinguished Chair in Intercultural Theology and the Study of Religions. He is a member of "HolyLit: Religion and Literature," of the Freie Universität Berlin and Harvard University and has been a member of the Dante Society Executive Council by general election of the Dante Society of America.

Work 
Franke's  philosophical work intertwines with his production as a theorist in comparative literature. His interdisciplinary approach centers on Dante’s Divine Comedy read as theological revelation in poetic language. His book,  Dante’s Interpretive Journey (1996) constructs an interpretation of the Comedy in dialogue with German hermeneutic theory (Heidegger, Gadamer, Fuchs, Ebeling, Bultmann). The sequel, Dante and the Sense of Transgression: The Trespass of the Sign (2012), complements it by bringing the Comedy into dialogue with contemporary French thought of difference (Bataille, Blanchot, Barthes, Levinas, Derrida). While using the instruments of contemporary literary theory to read Dante's poem, these books also leverage Dante's medieval theological vision in order to level critiques against modern thinking forgetful of its grounds in sources that transcend rational justification and can only be imagined. 2021 saw the publication of three monographs by Franke rewriting the history of philosophy as pivoting around Dante rather than Descartes viewed as origin for emerging modern forms of self-reflection. These books bring the thinking at work in Dante’s poetry to bear on our contemporary philosophical problematics. They were collectively awarded the Hermes Prize by the International Institute for Hermeneutics for Book of the Year in Phenomenological Hermeneutics. 

Franke's work of speculative criticism powered by philosophical reflection is shaped into a comprehensive poetics of revelation starting with Poetry and Apocalypse: Theological Disclosures of Poetic Language (2009). This involves a construction of Christian epic tradition extending backward from James Joyce to Dante's essential source texts in antiquity and the Middle Ages with The Revelation of Imagination: From the Bible and Homer through Virgil and Augustine to Dante (2015). Moving in the opposite direction, Secular Scriptures: Modern Theological Poetics in the Wake of Dante (2016) traces the inheritance of Dante's theological vision forward into the modern era of secularized prophetic poetry and poetics.  These critical interventions are at the same time theoretical employments of literature to engage certain of the chief intellectual problems of our own time, beginning from the status of knowledge as science and as revelation.

Franke has   published well over a hundred essays and articles  of philosophical and theological interpretations of literature ranging from the biblical prophets and classical poets to Shakespeare and Milton, Dickinson, Baudelaire, Edmond Jabès, and Paul Celan. These essays deal also with theoretical topics such as dialectical and deconstructive logic, figurative rhetoric, psychoanalysis as a hermeneutics of subjectivity, postsecular critical reason, and cultural theory in the wake of the death of God.  Those of a more literary-critical bent include interventions on the canon debate, world literature, postcolonial ethics, and postmodern (non)identities.

Bibliography
Dante’s Vita Nuova and the New Testament: Hermeneutics and the Poetics of Revelation. Cambridge: Cambridge University Press, 2021 (299 + xix pages)
The Divine Vision of Dante’s Paradiso: The Metaphysics of Representation. Cambridge: Cambridge University Press, 2021 (304 + xx pages)
Dante’s Paradiso and the Theological Origins of Modern Thought: Toward a Speculative Philosophy of Self-Reflection. New York: Routledge, 2021 (334 + xxii pages) Routledge Interdisciplinary Perspectives on Literature Series
On the Universality of What is Not: The Apophatic Turn in Critical Thinking. Notre Dame: University of Notre Dame Press, 2020 (450 pages)
A Theology of Literature: The Bible as Revelation in the Tradition of the Humanities. Eugene, Oregon: Wipf and Stock Publishers, 2017. Cascade Companions series, Cascade Books Imprint (104 + ix pages)
Apophatic Paths from Europe to China: Regions Without Borders. Albany: State University of New York Press, 2018. Series on Chinese Philosophy and Culture, edited by Roger Ames (270 pages)
Secular Scriptures: Modern Theological Poetics in the Wake of Dante.  Columbus: Ohio State University Press: 2016 (256 + xii pages) Literature, Religion, and Postsecular Studies series, edited by Lori Branch
The Revelation of Imagination: From the Bible and Homer through Virgil and Augustine to Dante.  Evanston: Northwestern University Press, 2015 (424 + xii pages)
A Philosophy of the Unsayable. Notre Dame: University of Notre Dame Press, 2014 (384 + viii pages)
Dante and the Sense of Transgression: ‘The Trespass of the Sign.’  London and New York: Continuum [Bloomsbury Academic], 2013.  New Directions in Religion and Literature Series, edited by Mark Knight and Emma Mason (200 + xv pages)
Poetry and Apocalypse: Theological Disclosures of Poetic Language. Stanford: Stanford University Press: 2009 (211 + xiv pages).  Translated into German as: Dichtung und Apokalypse: Theologische Erschliessungen der dichterischen Sprache.  Aus dem Amerikanischen von Ursula Liebing und Michael Sonntag. Salzburger Theologische Studien Band 39 (Interkulturell 6) Innsbruck: Tyrolia Verlag, 2011   (216 pages)
On What Cannot Be Said: Apophatic Discourses in Philosophy, Religion, Literature, and the Arts.  Notre Dame, Indiana: University of Notre Dame Press, 2007. Edited with Theoretical and Critical Essays by William Franke. Vol. I: Classic Formulations (401 + xi pages); Vol. II: Modern and Contemporary Transformations (480 + viii pages)
Dante’s Interpretive Journey.  Chicago: University of Chicago Press, 1996 (242 + xi pages) Religion and Postmodernism series, edited by Mark C. Taylor
Transcendence, Immanence, and Intercultural Philosophy. Edited by Nahum Brown and William Franke. New York: Palgrave Macmillan, 2016.

References

External links 
Homepage of William Franke
Reviews of Books
Berlin Lecture (2022): Self-Reflection and Reduction in the Language of Lyric
Glasgow Lecture (2016): Method and Mysticism in Intercultural Philosophy                 
York Lecture (2018): Early Modern Apophasis
Brisbane Lecture (2018): At the Creative Source of the Arts
Poitiers Lecture (2019): Négativité de la révélation prophétique-poétique dans la modernité - Mallarmé, Dante, Shakespeare
Navarra Lecture (2018): Negative Theology, Poetic Prophecy, and the Religious Cementing of Society
Taiwan Lecture (2018): Between Humanity and Divinity, Part 1 Part 2 Part 3
 Beijing Lecture (2016): Liberal Arts Education as Learned Ignorance: An East-Asian Vantage Point
 Beijing World Congress of Philosophy Lecture (2018): Outline of an Intercultural Philosophy of Universalism
 Saarbrücken Lecture (2017): Traum-Epistemologie und religiöse Offenbarung in Dantes Vita nuova
 Sri Lanka Lecture (2014): Rethinking Cultural Universality Today

1956 births
Living people
American philosophers
Vanderbilt University people
Vanderbilt University alumni